Rami Bedoui (born 19 January 1990) is a Tunisian professional footballer who plays as a centre back for Club Africain and the Tunisia national team.

International career
In June 2018 he was named in Tunisia's 23-man squad for the 2018 FIFA World Cup in Russia.

Career statistics

International

Honours
Étoile du Sahel
 Tunisian Ligue Professionnelle 1: 2015–16; runners-up: 2010–11, 2014–15, 2016–17
 Tunisian Cup: 2012, 2013–14, 2014–15; runners-up: 2010–11

References

External links

1990 births
Living people
Tunisian footballers
Association football central defenders
Tunisia international footballers
People from Sousse
2018 FIFA World Cup players
2015 Africa Cup of Nations players
Étoile Sportive du Sahel players
Al-Fayha FC players
FK Liepāja players
Kuwait SC players
Tunisian Ligue Professionnelle 1 players
Saudi Professional League players
Latvian Higher League players
Kuwait Premier League players
Expatriate footballers in Saudi Arabia
Expatriate footballers in Latvia
Expatriate footballers in Kuwait
Tunisian expatriate sportspeople in Saudi Arabia
Tunisian expatriate sportspeople in Kuwait
2019 Africa Cup of Nations players